Sahil is an Indian male given name of Sanskrit origin.

Notable people with the name 
 Afroz Alam Sahil, Indian journalist
 Sahil Anand, Indian actor
 Sahil Babayev, Azerbaijani government minister
 Sahil Deshmukh Khan, Indian actor
 Sahil Gupta, Indian cricketer
 Sahil Khan, Indian actor
 Sahil Khattar, Indian actor
 Sahil Mehta, Indian actor
 Sahil Panwar, Indian footballer
 Sahil Patel, South African cricketer
 Sahil Salathia, Indian actor
 Sahil Sandhu, Canadian soccer player
 Sahil Sharma, Indian cricketer
 Sahil Shroff, Indian actor
 Sahil Suhaimi, Singaporean cricketer
 Sahil Tavora, Indian footballer
 Sahil Uppal, Indian actor
 Sahil Vaid, Indian actor
 Sheikh Sahil, Indian footballer
 Syed Sahil Agha, Indian author

See also
 Sahel (disambiguation)
 Sahel

References

Indian masculine given names
Arabic masculine given names